Richard Sands may refer to:

 Richard Sands (businessman) (born 1950s), American businessman
 Richard Sands (DJ), American radio DJ and program director
 Richard Sands (equestrian) (born 1947), Australian Olympic equestrian